"Jumping All Over the World" is a song by German musical group Scooter, taken from their 13th studio album, Jumping All Over the World (2007). In the United Kingdom, it was the band's highest-charting single in five years, reaching number 28 in the UK Singles Chart. The radio edit of the song features an extra verse, an altered opening, and an added crowd chorus near the end of the song. This differs from the album edit that has only one verse and no crowd chorus.

Samples used
 The four bar melody (played at two different intervals in the song) is based on the hardstyle track "Rock Civilization" by Headhunterz, released in June 2007.
 "Jumping All Over the World" is based around a sample from the song "A Glass Of Champagne" written by Georg Kajanus for the pop group Sailor, taken from their 1975 album Trouble.
 "B.O.B." samples "Laura Palmer's Theme" from the American television series Twin Peaks. The title is a reference to Killer Bob, a character in the show.

Music video
The music video features lead Scooter singer H.P. Baxxter singing, while the Sheffield Jumpers are Jumping at different sites in the world. The Sheffield Jumpers were actually sent to these locations, such as India, Japan, Russia, and the United Kingdom. Concert footage is also used.

Track listings
CD Maxi

12-inch

Download

UK CD Maxi / UK Download

Charts

Weekly charts

Year-end charts

Certifications

References

Scooter (band) songs
2008 singles
2008 songs
All Around the World Productions singles
Jumpstyle songs
Songs written by H.P. Baxxter
Songs written by Jens Thele
Songs written by Michael Simon (DJ)
Songs written by Rick J. Jordan